Carpinus cordata is a species of flowering plant belonging to the family Betulaceae.

Its native range is Primorye, China, Korea, Japan.

References

cordata